Peperomia yungasana is a species of plant of the genus Peperomia, from Bolivia. It was described by Casimir de Candolle in 1914.

References

yungasana
Flora of South America
Flora of Bolivia
Plants described in 1914
Taxa named by Casimir de Candolle